The England women's national lacrosse team represents England at women's lacrosse. It is governed by the English Lacrosse Association. They were runners-up in the Women's Lacrosse World Cup twice, and have also hosted the tournament twice. The team came 3rd in the 2017 Women's Lacrosse World Cup, which has held in Oshawa, Canada. The team is a full member of the Federation of International Lacrosse.

England will be hosting the 2017 Women's Lacrosse World Cup . The tournament will be held at the Surrey Sports Park in Guildford, Surrey, in the South East of England, with 30 nations expected to compete. The official team colours of the English national team are red and white. Kukri are Team England's official on-field and off-field teamwear providers. STX are Team England's official equipment providers.

See also
Lacrosse in England
England men's national lacrosse team
Sport in England

References

National lacrosse teams
Women's lacrosse teams
Lacrosse
English lacrosse teams
Women's lacrosse in the United Kingdom